Ministry of Social Development and Family was created in 2021, after it was separated from the Ministry of Labor. The current minister is Maryam bint Ali bin Nasser Al-Misnad.

Ministry tasks 

 Propose and implement national strategies, plans and policies related to the care of the family and its members. 
 Raising community awareness for the importance of protecting the family and family cohesion. 
 Supervising the organization of the charitable works sector. 
 Providing social security services to eligible beneficiaries. 
 Registration and publication of private associations and institutions and control over them. 
 Propose and implement policies related to housing and follow up their implementation. 
 Collecting and analyzing data and statistics related to the family and benefiting from them in the relevant programs, plans and policies, in coordination with the concerned governmental and private agencies. 
 Preparing and implementing programs and related services for all categories of beneficiaries of social security services.

Source:

References 

Government of Qatar
Government ministries of Qatar